Constitutional Assembly elections were held in Syria on 16 November 1949, with a second round on 25 November. The result was a victory for the People's Party, which won 63 of the 113 seats.

Results

References

Syria
1949 in Syria
Parliamentary elections in Syria
Election and referendum articles with incomplete results